Gunfighters of Abilene is a 1960 American Western film directed by Edward L. Cahn and starring Buster Crabbe, Barton MacLane and Judith Ames.

Plot
A gunfighter, Kip Tanner, is ambushed by three men who believe Kip's brother Gene swindled their boss, rancher Seth Heinline. A last-minute arrival by Marshal Wilkinson results in the men riding off and Kip coming to town, where he intends to find out what happened to Gene.

Kip concludes that Seth's men framed Gene, which concerns Seth's daughter Alice Heinline, who wanted Gene to marry her. Her own brother Jud makes an attempt on Kip's life, but hotel desk clerk Raquel Tareda comes to his rescue because she knows Gene to be innocent. Seth shoots at the wrong man, accidentally killing his own son instead of Kip, and ends up shot himself in a final gunfight.

Cast
 Buster Crabbe as Kip Tanner
 Barton MacLane as Seth Heinline
 Rachel Ames as Alice Heinline (as Judith Ames)
 Russell Thorson as Marshal Wilkinson
 Lee Farr as Jud Hainline
 Eugenia Paul as Raquel Torena
 Jan Arvan as Miguel Torena
 Richard Devon as Marty Ruger
 Richard H. Cutting as Hendricks
 Kenneth MacDonald as Harker

See also
 List of American films of 1960

References

External links
 
 
 

1960 films
American black-and-white films
American Western (genre) films
1960 Western (genre) films
Films directed by Edward L. Cahn
Films produced by Edward Small
Films scored by Paul Dunlap
United Artists films
1960s English-language films
1960s American films